The 2008–09 Second League of Republika Srpska season was the fourteenth since its establishment.

Group East

Clubs and stadiums

League standings

Group West

Clubs and stadiums

League standings

External links
http://www.bihsoccer.com/?s=dlrs_i_tabela
https://web.archive.org/web/20140819123235/http://www.fsrs.org/index.php?n=modules%2Farhiva
https://web.archive.org/web/20140819123235/http://www.fsrs.org/index.php?n=modules%2Farhiva

Bos
Second League of the Republika Srpska
3